Districts (huyện), also known as rural districts, are one of several types of second-tier administrative subdivisions of Vietnam, the other types being urban districts (quận), provincial cities, municipal city, and district-level towns. The districts are subdivisions of the first-tier divisions, namely the provinces and municipalities. Districts are subdivided into third-tier units, namely townships and communes.

History
The districts existed since the 15th century. Prior to 1945 the huyện (chữ Hán: 縣) was also called district and earlier "sub-prefecture" of the prefectures, or phủ into which provinces were previously divided. The administrative reorganization by Minh Mạng in 1832 did not substantially affect the position of the huyện, but concentrated administration of the level above the huyện, the phủ under new larger unit of the tỉnh and provincial governors. The position of local prefects and district heads remained unaffected.

See also
 List of districts of Vietnam
 Commune-level subdivisions (Vietnam): commune (xã), commune-level town (thị trấn), urban ward (phường)
 Ward (Vietnam) phường, urban subdistrict

Notes

References

Sources

 
 
 
 
 

Subdivisions of Vietnam
Vietnam 2
History of Vietnam